Moores Creek National Battlefield is a battlefield managed by the U.S. National Park Service. The park commemorates the 1776 victory of a thousand patriots over about eight hundred loyalists at Moore's Creek. The battle dashed the hopes of British provincial governor Josiah Martin for regaining control of North Carolina  for the Crown. The loyalist defeat simultaneously ended British plans for an invasionary force to land in Brunswick Town. The Second Continental Congress voted to declare independence from the British on July 4, 1776, shortly after the battle; which took place in the Wilmington area near Currie in Pender County in southeastern North Carolina. The national military park was established on June 2, 1926, and was redesignated as a national battlefield on September 8, 1980.

Background
Loyalists, mostly Scottish Highlanders, many of whom did not have muskets and were wielding broadswords, expected to find only a small Patriot force on February 27, 1776.  Before the arrival of the Loyalists, the Patriots removed the planks from the bridge that crossed Moore's Creek.  After removing the planks of wood, they smeared the remaining crossing beams with lard. This forced the Loyalists to cross the bridge in single file. As the Loyalists advanced across the bridge, Patriot shots rang out and dozens of Loyalists fell into the creek below, including their commanders.  At the time, the creek was an estimated six feet deep. One commander, Lieutenant Colonel Donald McLeod, died in the battle. Another commander was Colonel Allan MacDonald, the husband of Flora MacDonald of Highland lore who aided Bonnie Prince Charlie following the Jacobite defeat at Culloden Moor in 1746.

Stunned, outgunned and leaderless, the Loyalists either surrendered or retreated in confusion. Wagons, weapons and British Pound sterling worth more than $1 million by today's value were seized by the Patriots in the days following the battle.

This dramatic victory ended British authority in the colony and greatly influenced North Carolina to be the first colony to vote for independence. The Battle of Moores Creek Bridge, coupled with the Battle of Sullivan's Island near Charleston, South Carolina, a few months later, were the first open conflicts of the American Revolution. Both ultimately led the Thirteen Colonies to declare independence on July 4, 1776.

Description and administrative history

The central Moores Creek most likely was named in honor of Elizabeth Moore, a pioneer settler.

Throughout the park, there are remnants of the 1776 road traveled by Patriot and Loyalist forces. A 1-mile (1.6-km) trail with wayside exhibits leads through the battlefield and across Moores Creek. The historic bridge site is located along the trail. The park, located in a rural area, offers a visitor center with exhibits and audio-visual program, a 0.3-mile (500 m) colonial forest trail, and a picnic area.

Gallery

References

Further reading
 "Mary Slocumb at Moore's Creek Bridge," Revolutionary North Carolina, a digital textbook produced by the UNC School of Education.

External links
 

1926 establishments in North Carolina
Archaeological sites on the National Register of Historic Places in North Carolina
American Revolution on the National Register of Historic Places
American Revolutionary War museums
American Revolutionary War sites in North Carolina
Conflict sites on the National Register of Historic Places in North Carolina
Historic districts on the National Register of Historic Places in North Carolina
Military and war museums in North Carolina
Museums in Pender County, North Carolina
National Battlefields and Military Parks of the United States
National Park Service areas in North Carolina
National Register of Historic Places in Pender County, North Carolina
Protected areas established in 1926
Protected areas of Pender County, North Carolina

de:Schlacht von Moores Creek Bridge